Tapping the Vein may refer to:
Phlebotomy
Tapping the Vein (comic), a comic series of Clive Barker's short stories from The Books of Blood published between 1989 and 1992
Tapping the Vein (album), a 1992 studio album by German thrash metal band Sodom
Tapping the Vein (band), an Industrial Rock band from Philadelphia, USA. Featuring Paradise Lost guest vocalist Heather Thompson. Notable releases: The Damage (2002) & Another Day Down (2009)